John Brown (born June 26, 1988) is an American football offensive lineman for the Florida Tarpons of the American Arena League (AAL). He played college football at University of Florida, Northwest Mississippi Community College and Valdosta State University and attended Lakeland High School in Lakeland, Florida. He has also been a member of the Tampa Bay Storm and Orlando Predators.

College career
Brown played for the Florida Gators from 2007 to 2008, Northwest Mississippi Rangers in 2009 and the Valdosta State Blazers in 2010. He played in zero games for the Gators, dressing for one game before having wrist surgery. After two years at Florida, Brown transferred to Northwest Mississippi Community College. After one season at Northwert Mississippi, Brown initially committed to Tennessee, but attended Valdosta State instead.

Professional career

Tampa Bay Storm
Brown was assigned to the Tampa Bay Storm of the Arena Football League on July 18, 2013.

Orlando Predators
On July 30, 2015, Brown was assigned to the Orlando Predators. On August 30, 2015, Brown was placed on recallable reassignment. On March 9, 2016, Brown was assigned to the Predators once again. On March 25, 2016, Brown was placed on recallable reassignment.

Tampa Bay Storm
Brown was assigned to the Storm on May 19, 2016. Brown started 8 games at fullback for the Storm. He ran for 21 yards and two touchdowns. Following the season, the Storm picked up Brown's rookie option. Brown was named the starting fullback for the Storm in 2017. On May 11, 2017, Brown was placed on reassignment. Brown was assigned on May 16, 2017. On May 19, 2017, Brown was placed on reassignment once again. On June 8, 2017, Brown was assigned to the Storm. On June 15, 2017, Brown was placed on reassignment.

Florida Tarpons
Brown signed with the Florida Tarpons for the 2018 season.

References

External links

Florida Gators profile
Valdosta State Blazers profile

Living people
1988 births
Players of American football from Florida
American football offensive linemen
Florida Gators football players
Northwest Mississippi Rangers football players
Valdosta State Blazers football players
Orlando Predators players
Tampa Bay Storm players
Florida Tarpons players
Sportspeople from Lakeland, Florida